Zoram, IPA-ified from «zō´rum», is the name of three individuals in the Book of Mormon, indexed in the LDS edition as Zoram1, Zoram2, and Zoram3.

Zoram1 

Zoram1 was the servant of Laban, a wealthy inhabitant of Jerusalem. According to First Nephi, Zoram led Nephi, disguised as Laban, into Laban's treasury. Nephi, speaking "in the voice of Laban" commanded Zoram to take the brass plates containing "a record of the Jews" to his brethren. Zoram, "supposing that [he] spake of the brethren of the church" took the plates and carried them to where Nephi's brothers were waiting. When he discovered the truth, Zoram was frightened, so Nephi promised to spare his life if Zoram swore allegiance to them, and was permitted to accompany Nephi and his brethren.

Zoram2 

Zoram2 was a chief captain of the Nephite army, mentioned in only two verses in the Book of Mormon. He sought the guidance of Alma, the high priest, in locating Nephites that had been captured by the Lamanites, his son Lehi joining him. He also won a victory over the Lamanites after crossing the river Sidon.

Zoram3 

Zoram3 was a Nephite apostate, mentioned only briefly, but notable as the leader of the Zoramites, an apostate group. In reaction to the possibility of his people joining the Lamanites, Alma the younger led a missionary effort to bring back the people. Zoram was cited for leading the people to bow down to idols.

Book of Mormon Movie
In The Book of Mormon Movie, Vol. 1: The Journey, adapted from First and Second Nephi, Zoram1 was played by Todd Davis. The portrayals were highly influenced by Arnold Friberg paintings of the characters.

References

Book of Mormon people